As a nickname, Mac may refer to:

McGeorge Bundy (1919–1996), United States National Security Advisor to Presidents John F. Kennedy and Lyndon B. Johnson
Mac Brandt (born 1980), American actor
Mac Cody (born 1972), American National Football League player
Mac Colville (1916–2003), Canadian National Hockey League player
Mac Curtis (1939–2013), American musician
Mac DeMarco (born 1990), Canadian singer-songwriter, musician and producer
Mac Evans (1884–1977), Australian cricket and soccer player
Mac Foster (1942–2010), American heavyweight boxer
Mac Jones (born 1998), American football player
Mac Martin (1925-2022), American bluegrass musician
Mac May (born 1999), American volleyball player
Mac McCain (born 1998), American football player
Clark McConachy (1895–1980), New Zealand billiards and snooker player
Stan McCormick (1923–1999), English rugby league footballer and coach
Charles H. MacDonald (1914–2002), American World War II fighter ace
Linious "Mac" McGee (1897–1988), Alaskan aviation pioneer and founder of McGee Airways
Mac McNeilly (born 1960), American drummer
 Malcolm John "Mac" Rebennack (1940–2019), better known by the stage name Dr. John, American singer-songwriter, pianist and guitarist
Mac Sebree (1932–2010), American journalist, writer and publisher
Macdonald Smith (1892–1949), Scottish golfer
McLean Stevenson (1927–1996), American actor
Mac Suzuki (born 1975), Major League Baseball pitcher from Japan
Mac Wiseman (1925–2019), American bluegrass singer

See also 
All pages with titles beginning with Mac
All pages with titles containing Mac
Mac (disambiguation)
Big Mac (disambiguation)
Johnny Mac (disambiguation)
Little Mac (disambiguation)
Mack (given name)
Ian McCulloch (singer) (born 1959), lead singer of the English band Echo & The Bunnymen, nicknamed "Mac the Mouth"

Lists of people by nickname
English masculine given names